Street Dreams may refer to:

Films
Street Dreams (film), a 2009 American film

Music

Albums
Street Dreams (Fabolous album)
Street Dreams a 1988 Lyle Mays album
Street Dreams (Chet Atkins album)

Songs
"Street Dreams" (song), a song by Nas
"Street Dreams", a song by Hollywood Undead on the 2011 album American Tragedy

See also
Sweet Dreams (disambiguation)
Dream Street